The Middle East Economic Association (MEEA) is a private, non-profit, and non-political organization of scholars interested in the study of economies and economics of the Middle East.  The geographical term "Middle East" is used in its widest usage. Its objectives shall be:

 promotion of high standard scholarship,
 facilitation of communication among scholars through meetings and publications, and
 promotion of cooperation among persons and organizations committed to the objectives of MEEA.

MEEA officers 
The current MEEA officers are:

Past presidents 
Past Presidents of the association are:
 Serdar Sayan, 2010-2012
 Hadi Salehi Esfahani, 2007-2009
 Jeffrey B. Nugent, 2004-2006
 Mine Cinar, 1999-2003
 Fatemah Moghadam, 1997-1998
 Sohrab Behdad, 1995-1996
 Abbas Alnasrawi, 1990-1994 (In Memoriam)
 Manoucher Parvin, 1986-1989
 Stanislaw Wellisz, 1984-1985
 Charles Issawi, 1978-1983

See also
 American Economic Association
 European Economic Association

References

Academic organizations based in the United States
International economic organizations
Middle East